Chaim Shalom Tuvia Rabinowitz, also known as Reb Chaim Telzer, (1856 – 21 October 1931) was an Orthodox Lithuanian rabbi and rosh yeshiva of the Telshe yeshiva. He developed a unique method of Talmudic analysis which became renowned throughout the yeshiva world as the Telzer Derech.

Biography
He was born in the town of Luknik, Lithuania, and studied under Rabbi Meir Simcha of Dvinsk, Rabbi Yisroel Salanter, and Rabbi Yitzchak Elchanan Spektor. He married Osnat Geffen (1880–1942) with whom he had two sons, Yosef and Azriel.

Following the death of Rabbi Spektor in 1896, his son, Rabbi Zvi Hirsch Spektor, renamed the yeshiva that his father had founded in Kovno, Knesses Beis Yitzchok and chose Rabinowitz as the first rosh yeshiva. After this, Rabinowitz served as rabbi to the town of Meishad, Lithuania.

Telshe
Rabinowitz next moved to the Telshe yeshiva as a rosh mesivta under Rabbi Eliezer Gordon. In 1904 Rabbi Shimon Shkop, who had replaced Rabbi Gordon as rosh yeshiva, left the Telshe yeshiva and Rabinowitz replaced him as rosh yeshiva. Rabbi Rabinowitz taught in the Telshe yeshiva for twenty-six years. He was known for his high-level shiurim in Halakha and his special talent for chakira (intensive investigation) into each subject he taught. In each chakira, he would present to his students the two opposing viewpoints and teach them how to dissect each argument point-by-point, developing their acuity and analytical skills. Although his approach was different from that of Rabbi Bloch and his family, it was accepted in the yeshiva and renowned throughout the Eastern European Torah world.

Among his students was Rabbi Shimon Schwab.

Death and legacy
Rabinowitz died on 21 October 1931 (10 Cheshvan 5692) and was buried in the Kovno Jewish cemetery. His son, Rabbi Azriel Rabinowitz (1905–1941), assumed his father's position as rosh yeshiva of the Telshe yeshiva.

Rabbi Rabinowitz has no surviving descendants, as his wife, sons and their families were all murdered by the Nazis in Telshe in 1941 and 1942.

During his lifetime and afterwards, Rabbi Rabinowitz's Talmudic lectures were recorded by a special yeshiva editorial committee and made available to students. The unpublished shiurim of Rabbi Rabinowitz and Rabbi Yosef Leib Bloch, now housed in the Telshe yeshiva of Cleveland, are considered the "foundation stones" for the study of Torah in the Telshe yeshiva to this day.

Three volumes of Rabbi Rabinowitz's Talmudic lectures have been published by the Telshe yeshiva in Cleveland, under the title Chiddushei Rabbi Chaim MiTelz.

References

External links
An explanation and synopsis of the Telzer Derech
"An Analysis of Darchei HaLimud (Methodologies of Talmud Study) Centering on a Cup of Tea"

Rosh yeshivas
1856 births
1931 deaths
Date of birth missing
Lithuanian Jews
Rabbis from Telšiai